Jakub Novák (born 30 December 1990 in Pardubice) is a performance cycling coach and retired Czech professional cyclist. 

As a professional cyclist, Jakub rode for BMC Pro Racing Team, alongside Tour de France winner Cadel Evans and World Champion Philipe Gilbert. Jakub participated 5x at World Championship and became 3x National Champion. 

Since his retirement, he has been passing on valuable experiences to professional and amateur athletes.

Palmares

2008
7th Overall Po Stajerski
2010
 1st  Time trial, National Under–23 Road Championships
2011
 1st  Road race, National Under–23 Road Championships
1st Stage 6 Girobio (ITT)
5th European Championships U23 (ITT)
11th World Championships U23 (ITT)
2012
 1st  Time trial, National Under–23 Road Championships
2nd Overall Carpathia Couriers Path
1st Stage 4 
3rd Trofeo Città di San Vendemiano
2013
6th Chrono Champenois
11th Overall Tour of Alberta
4th Overall Cascade Cycling Classic
2014
1st place Shimano Road Race Suzuka

References 

1990 births
Living people
Czech male cyclists
Sportspeople from Pardubice